Jonathan E. Malaya is a Filipino writer, author, businessman, and public official who is currently the Undersecretary of the Department of the Interior and Local Government. As an additional, he also manage PDP Laban Federalism Institute, as its Executive Director, the institute is a political think tank established by Senate President Koko Pimentel. He is also a member of the Technical Working Group advising the House of Representatives on proposed amendments to the Constitution. In the past he also served as Assistant Secretary in the Office of the President of the Philippines, and Assistant Secretary for Special Projects and Legislative Liaison in the Department of Education of the Philippines.

Malaya is a former writer of opinion column in Philippine newspapers Remate* and Remate Express, and has edited several publications including Liberal Philippines magazine and Bagong Pasay Ngayon.

Background 

Malaya was born on July 13, 1973, in Naga City, Camarines Sur, Philippines to Judge Angel S. Malaya of Iriga City and Dr. Corazon E. Malaya of Goa, Camarines Sur. He grew up in Iriga City where he attended elementary and high school at La Consolacion Academy (now La Consolacion College) where he was an honor student, president of the student assembly, and founding editor of the school paper.

He pursued his undergraduate studies in the University of the Philippines, Diliman, Quezon City where he was a founding member and president of the UP Debate Society, Philippine Collegian writer, and member of the Alpha Phi Beta fraternity. He won the championship of the annual UP Pi Sigma Open Debate Tournament in 1992. He later took courses on Management Development from the Asian Institute of Management in Makati City, Philippines.

As member of the UP Debating Team, he won as Best Debater in the 3rd National Collegiate Debate Finals in 1994 and was ranked the 2nd Best Asian Debater in the 15th World Universities Debating Championships in Princeton University, New Jersey in 1995.

Public service 

Malaya immediately joined government service after college. In a career in public service spanning 20 years, he had stints in all three branches of the government first serving as a Legislative Staff Officer to then Samar Congressman (later Supreme Court Justice) Antonio Eduardo B. Nachura in the House of Representatives of the Philippine Congress. He later served as Chief Legislative Staff Officer to then Senator (later Department of Interior and Local Government Secretary) Mar Roxas in the Philippine Senate.

In 2005 he served in the Executive Branch as Chief of Staff to then Education Secretary (later Department of Budget and Management Secretary) Florencio B. Abad. A year later, at age 32, he was appointed Assistant Secretary in the Office of the Chief Presidential Legal Counsel by President Gloria Macapagal Arroyo. He was later seconded by Arroyo to the Office of the Solicitor General again as Chief of Staff.

In 2007, he served briefly as Judicial Staff Head to Associate Justice Antonio Eduardo B. Nachura in the Philippine Supreme Court before he returned to the Department of Education as Assistant Secretary during the term of then Education Secretary Jesli A. Lapus.

After his stint at the Department of Education, Malaya joined the Pasay city government in 2011 as Spokesperson and Public Information Officer under Mayor Antonino G.Calixto. During that time he also serve as Senior Technical Adviser on Education and Electoral Reform to the Foundation for Economic Freedom, and The Asia Foundation, and Legal Network for Truthful Elections.

In 2017, he was appointed as Assistant Secretary for Capacity Development, Public Affairs and Communication in the Department of Interior and Local Government by President Rodrigo Roa Duterte. He was later appointed as administrator of Federalism, on that same year. DILG Officer in Charge Eduardo Año appointed him as the new DILG spokesperson.

Teaching career 

Malaya was a part-time lecturer at the College of Economics, Finance, and Politics of the Polytechnic University of the Philippines and at the Assumption College San Lorenzo. He taught political theory and English literature. He also served as Regent of the City University of Pasay and was instrumental in the establishment of the Imus City Polytechnic Institute.

He is now on his second term as Board Member of the National Music Competition for Young Artists (NAMCYA), a resident company of the Cultural Center of the Philippines.

Department of Education 

In the Department of Education, Malaya brought with him a wealth of experience in public sector reform, legislation, and public administration that he acquired from extensive government experience.

He chaired both the Association of South East Asian Nations (ASEAN) Senior Officials in Education Meeting and the South East Asian Ministers of Education (SEAMEO) High Officials Meeting in 2009–2010. He also headed the Philippine Delegation to ASEAN + 3 (China, Japan, Korea) Senior Officials Meeting on Education in 2010. He was also a member of the Board of Trustees of the ASEAN Universities Network as well as the Governing Board member of the SEAMEO Regional Center QITEP-English based in Jogjakarta, Indonesia.

Teacher's welfare 

As DepEd Legislative Liaison Officer, he successfully secured Congressional support to upgrade the salary grade and salaries of all public school teachers through Congressional Joint Resolution No. 4 otherwise known as the Salary Standardization Law III.

With the support of Gawad Kalinga and local government units, he spearheaded the construction of socialized housing projects for teachers in Camarines Norte, Cebu and Davao City.  As OIC-Superintendent of Baguio Teachers’ Camp, he implemented a Master Redevelopment Plan that transformed the once run-down facility into DepEd's premier training and recreation center. He also established the Sining Pambansa Festival and institutionalized the Pambansang Gawad sa Ulirang Kabataan.

He received a Presidential Citation from Arroyo and the DepEd Certificate of Recognition from Education Secretary Armin Luistro for outstanding performance in the public sector.

Written works 

Malaya has written four (4) books, which includeds So Help Us God: The Presidents of the Philippines and Their Inaugural Addresses which he co-wrote with his brother Ambassador J. Eduardo Malaya, Liberal Views on Constitutional Reform and Hit the Podium!: Getting Started in Debate.

Sources 

1973 births
Living people
Filipino writers
Filipino educators
People from Naga, Camarines Sur
Writers from Camarines Sur
People from Iriga
University of the Philippines Diliman alumni